Baphia macrocalyx is a species of plant in the family Fabaceae. It is found in Mozambique and Tanzania. It is threatened by habitat loss.

References

macrocalyx
Flora of Tanzania
Flora of Mozambique
Vulnerable plants
Taxonomy articles created by Polbot